The Daily Record is an American daily newspaper published in Ellensburg, Washington. The Record is published four days a week with an afternoon edition each Tuesday through Thursday and a weekend edition is delivered on Saturday mornings. The paper's current estimated circulation is 6,000 copies per day.

This newspaper is a successor to the Kittitas County Localizer, first published on July 12, 1883. After the official founding of the town of Ellensburg, that paper became the Ellensburg Localizer. On July 1, 1909, the paper, now under the ownership of William S. Zimmerman and J.C. "Cliff" Kaynor, changed its name to the Evening Record. It is from this event that the modern edition of the newspaper marks its birth. Kaynor bought Zimmerman's share in 1912 and continued as the paper's sole publisher for nearly fifty years. The paper's name was changed to The Ellensburg Daily Record on April 23, 1938, and on March 14, 1973, the paper became simply The Daily Record to reflect its expanded focus on all of Kittitas County, Washington.

In August 1992, the newspaper was sold to McClatchy Newspapers Inc. In 1996, it was sold again to Pioneer News Group. The paper's Saturday edition was moved from afternoon to morning publication in October 1999. In October 2017, Pioneer News Group Co. announced that it was selling its media division assets, including the Daily Record, to the Adams Publishing Group.

References

External links

Publications established in 1909
Newspapers published in Washington (state)
Kittitas County, Washington
Daily newspapers published in the United States